Adam Gower Sutherland de Ross (1 April 1890 – 14 February 1917) was an Australian rules footballer who played with St Kilda in the Victorian Football League (VFL).

Family
The son of William de Ross (1834-1908), and Anne Robinson de Ross (1862-1913), née Clough, Adam Gower Sutherland de Ross was born at Talbot, Victoria on 1 April 1890.

Football

St Kilda (VFL)

Brunswick (VFA)
After eight games with St Kilda in 1909 he transferred to Brunswick, where he played until enlisting to serve in the Royal Air Force in World War I.

Death
He died on his first active mission after being shot down over France in 1917. He is commemorated at the Arras Flying Services Memorial.

See also
 List of Victorian Football League players who died on active service

Notes

References
 Commemorative Roll: Second Lieutenant Adam Gower Sutherland de Ross (9504), Australian War Memorial
("The Commemorative Roll records the names of those Australians who died during or as a result of wars in which Australians served, but who were not serving in the Australian Armed Forces and therefore not eligible for inclusion on the Roll of Honour.")
 2 Lt. de Ross, A.G.S., Royal Airforce Museum.

External links 
 
  
 Gower Ross, at The VFA Project.

1890 births
1917 deaths
Australian rules footballers from Victoria (Australia)
St Kilda Football Club players
Brunswick Football Club players
Australian military personnel killed in World War I